The Latial culture ranged approximately over ancient Old Latium. The Iron Age Latial culture coincided with the arrival in the region of a people who spoke Old Latin. The culture was likely therefore to identify a phase of the socio-political self-consciousness of the Latin tribe, during the period of the kings of Alba Longa and the foundation of the Roman Kingdom.

Latial culture is identified by their hut-shaped burial urns. Urns of the Proto-Villanovan culture are plain and biconical, and were buried in a deep shaft.  The hut urn is a round or square model of a hut with a peaked roof.  The interior is accessed by a door on one of its side. Cremation was practiced as well as burial. The style is distinctive. The hut urns were miniature versions of the huts in which the population lived, although during this period they also developed the use of stone for temples and other public buildings.

The Apennine culture of Latium transitioned smoothly into the Latial with no evidence of an intrusive population movement. The population generally abandoned sites of purely economic advantage in favor of defensible sites which later became cities. The term pre-urban is used for this era. The population movement to more defensible sites may indicate an increase in marauding.

Periodization
The periodization is accepted as standard with little variation; however, a tolerance of ±25 years is implied:

Sites
Latial I is concentrated in the Rome area, in the Alban Hills and in the Monti della Tolfa. Evidence of the civilization is mainly funerary obtained from necropoleis (cemeteries). Cremation was the predominant rite. Cremation burials consist of a hut-urn with ashes of the deceased placed in a dolium (large jar) with some other vessels used for food offerings. The pottery is undecorated. Instead of a hut-urn a vase with a cone-like roof or simulated helmet was sometimes used. The dolium was placed in a stone-lined pozzo (hole) and commemorated above-ground.

For grave goods, spindle-whorls identify females and miniature armor and weapons, males. Statuettes, some with hands outstretched, may be present.

Notes

References

External links
 
 

 
10th-century BC establishments
6th-century BC disestablishments
Archaeological cultures of Southern Europe
Archaeological cultures in Italy
Iron Age cultures of Europe
Italic archaeological cultures